Family K1 is a small group of the New Testament manuscripts. It belongs to the Byzantine text-type as one of the textual families of this group. It has five uncials, and several early minuscules. It is one of the smallest subfamilies of the Byzantine text-type, but one of the oldest.

Description 

The group was discovered by Hermann von Soden and designated by him with the symbol K1. Wisse included this group to the Kx (and Ki), and according to him it is the only subgroup or cluster of Kx.
But the opinion of Wisse is based on a small sample size, only three chapters of Luke — chapters 1; 10; and 20. Based on age alone, it appears that K1 is independent of Kx. The leading members of the group, according to Soden, are manuscripts S, V, and Ω.

According to Soden the group K1 is the oldest form of the Kappa–text, dating from the 4th century and resulting from Lucian's recension.

The texts of Matthew 16:2b–3 (the signs of the times), Luke 22:43-44, John 5:3.4, and the Pericope Adulterae (John 7:53–8:11) are marked with an asterisk (※) as doubtful.

The group probably evolved from Family E. It represents the earliest stage of the Kappa-text.

Members of the family 

 Codex Vaticanus 354 designated by S or 028 (Gregory-Aland), 949 A.D.
 Codex Mosquensis II designated by V or 031 (Gregory-Aland), 9th century
 Codex Athous Dionysiou designated by Ω or 045 (Gregory-Aland), 8th/9th century
 Uncial 0211, 7th century
 Minuscule 261, 12th century
 Minuscule 263, 13th century
 Minuscule 272, 11th century
 Minuscule 277, 11th century
 Minuscule 382, 11th century
 (Minuscule 399), 9th century
 Uspenski Gospels designated by 461 (Gregory-Aland), 835 A.D.
 Minuscule 476, 11th century
 Minuscule 500, 13th century
 Minuscule 509, 12th century
 Minuscule 655, 11th century
 Minuscule 661, 11th century
 Minuscule 699, 11th century
 Minuscule 711, 11th century

See also 
 Other subfamilies of the Byzantine text
 Family Kr
 Family Kx
 Family E
 Family Π
 Families associated with the Byzantine text
 Family 1424
 Family 1739

References

Further reading

External links 
 Text-Types and Textual Kinship at the Encyclopedia of Textual Criticism

Greek New Testament manuscripts